The following units and commanders fought in the Battle of Changde in early November through late December 1943, part of the Second Sino-Japanese War.

Japan
From end of October 1943.

Ground forces 

Eleventh Army
Lieut. General Isamu Yokoyama

 3rd Division
 Lieut. General Mitsuo Yamamoto
 3rd Infantry Brigade Group
 6th Infantry Regiment
 68th Infantry Regiment
 34th Infantry Regiment
 3rd Field Artillery Regiment
 3rd Cavalry Regiment
 3rd Engineer Regiment
 3rd Transport Regiment
 13th Division
 Lieut. General Tsutomu Akashika
 13th Infantry Brigade Group
 65th Infantry Regiment
 104th Infantry Regiment
 116th Infantry Regiment
 19th Mountain Artillery Regiment
 17th Cavalry Regiment
 13th Engineer Regiment
 13th Transport Regiment
 32nd Division (elements)
 Lieut. Gen. Yoshio Ishii
 32nd infantry Brigade Group
 210th Infantry Regiment
 211th  Infantry Regiment
 212th Infantry Regiment
 32nd Recon Regiment
 32nd Field Artillery Regiment
 32nd Transport Regiment
 32nd Transport Regiment

 34th Division (elements)
 Lieut. General Takeo Ban
 34th infantry Brigade Group
 216th Infantry Regiment
 217th Infantry Regiment
 218th Infantry Regiment
 34th Recon Regiment
 34th Field Artillery Regiment
 24th Transport Regiment
 34th Transport Regiment
 39th Division
 Lieut. General Raishiro Sumida
 39th Infantry Brigade Group
 231st Infantry Regiment
 232nd Infantry Regiment
 233rd Infantry Regiment
 39th Recon Regiment
 39th Field Artillery Regiment
 39th Military Engineer Regiment
 39th Transport Regiment
 40th Division (elements)
 Lieut. General Seiichi Aoki
 40th Infantry Brigade Group
 234th Infantry Regiment
 235th Infantry Regiment
 236th Infantry Regiment
 40th Cavalry Regiment
 40th Mountain Artillery Regiment
 40th Military Engineer Regiment
 40th Transport Regiment

 68th Division
 Lieut. General Tamejin Sakuma
 57th Infantry Brigade
 61st Independent Infantry Battalion
 62nd Independent Infantry Battalion
 63rd Independent Infantry Battalion
 64th Independent Infantry Battalion
 58th Infantry Brigade
 65th Independent Infantry Battalion
 115th Independent Infantry Battalion
 116th Independent Infantry Battalion 
 117th Independent Infantry Battalion
 Labor troops
 Signal communication unit 
 Transport team
 116th Division
 Lieut. General Hiroshi Iwanaga
 116th Infantry Brigade Group 
 109th Infantry Regiment 
 120th Infantry Regiment 
 133rd Infantry Regiment 
 122nd Field Artillery regiment 
 116th Military Engineer Regiment 
 116th Transport Regiment 
 17th Independent Mixed Brigade (elements)
 Lieut. General Kenichi Kishigawa
 87th Infantry Battalion
 88th Infantry Battalion
 89th Infantry Battalion
 90th Infantry Battalion
 91st Infantry Battalion
 Independent artillery troops
 Independent labor troops
 Independent signal communication unit

Naval forces 
 100 motorboats and junks

China
As of end of October 1943.

Ground forces 
National Military Council 

 Sixth War Area
 General Sun Lien-chung
 29th Army Group
 Wang Tsan-hu
 44th Corps – Wang Tse-chun
 105th Division 
 161st Division 
  162nd Division 
 73rd Corps – Wang Chih-pin
 15th Division
 77th Division 
 5th Provincial Division 
 10th Army Group 
 Wang Ching-Chiu
 79th Corps – Wang Chia-pen
 98th Division 
 194th Division  
 6th Provincial Division 
 66th Corps – Fang Ching
 185th Division 
 199th Division 
 River Defence Force
 Wu Chi-wei
 18th Corps – Lo Kuang-wen
 118th Division 
 18th Division 
 55th Division 
 86th Corps – Chu Ting-Chin
 13th Division 
 26th Army Group
 Chou Ai
 75th Corps – Liu Chi-ming
 6th Division 
 16th Division 
 4th Reserve Division 
 32nd Corps – Sung Ken-tang
 139th Division 
 141st Division 
 33rd Army Group
 Feng Chih-an
 59th Corps – Liu Chen-san
 38th Division 
 180th Division 
 34th Provincial Division 
 79th Corps – Ho Chi-feng
 30th Division 
 132nd Division 
 179th Division 
 Wang Yao-wu's Army
 74th Corps – Wang Yao-wu
 51st Division 
 57th Division (Defended Changteh)
 58th Division 
 100th Corps – Shih Chung-cheng
 19th Division 
 63rd Division

 Ninth War Area
 General Hsueh Yueh
 Li Yu-tang's Army
 99th Corps – Liang Han-ming
 92nd Division 
 197th Division 
 54th Provincial Division 
 10th Corps – Fang Hsien-chueh
 3rd Division 
 190th Division 
 10th Reserve Division 
 Ou Chen's Army
 Ou Chen
 58th Corps – Lu Tao-yuan
 New 10th Division 
 New 11th Division 
 72nd Corps – Fu Yi
 New 13th Division 
 New 15th Division 
 7th Provincial Division – Wang Tso-hua

Air forces 
 100 bombers and fighters

References

Sources

Print

Web 
 
 
 

Second Sino-Japanese War orders of battle
Battles of the Second Sino-Japanese War